An angel of mercy or angel of death is a type of criminal offender (often a type of serial killer) who is usually employed as a caregiver and intentionally harms or kills people under their care. The angel of mercy is often in a position of power and may decide the victim would be better off if they no longer suffered from whatever severe illness is plaguing them. This person then uses their knowledge to kill the victim. In some cases, as time goes on, this behavior escalates to encompass the healthy and the easily treated.

Characteristics and motivations 
The motivation for this type of criminal behaviour is variable, but generally falls into one or more types or patterns:
 Mercy killer: Believe the victims are suffering or beyond help, though this belief may be delusional.
 Sadistic: Use their position as a way of exerting power and control over helpless victims.
 Malignant hero: A pattern wherein the subject endangers the victim's life in some way and then proceeds to "save" them. Some feign attempting resuscitation, all the while knowing their victim is already dead and beyond help, but hope to be seen as selflessly making an effort.

In the medical field
Some people with a pathological interest in the power of life and death can be attracted to medical or related professions. Killers who occupy the role of a professional carer are sometimes referred to as "angels of death" or angels of mercy. In this role they may kill their patients for money, for a sense of sadistic pleasure, for a belief that they are "easing" the patient's pain, or simply "because they can". The typical medical professional who murders kills two patients each month.

One such killer was nurse Jane Toppan, who admitted during her murder trial that she was sexually aroused by death. She would administer a drug mixture to patients she chose as her victims, lie in bed with them and hold them close to her body as they died. Another example is Harold Shipman, an English family doctor, who made it appear that his victims died of natural causes (disease). Between 1975 and 1998, he murdered at least 215 patients; he is suspected of having murdered 250 people. Dr. John Bodkin Adams, meanwhile, though acquitted in 1957 of the murder of one patient, is believed to have killed around 163 patients in Eastbourne, England.

An example of a malignant hero serial killer was Richard Angelo, who was called the "angel of death", or angel of mercy. Angelo devised a plan where he would inject the patient with drugs, then rush into the room and attempt to "save" the patient so that he could be a hero to the patient's family. This motive of excitement from inducing a health crisis for the patient has recently been labeled as a professional version of Münchausen syndrome by proxy, a type of factitious disorder. Richard Angelo confessed to killing 25 of his patients.

A number of medical murderers were involved in fraud. For example, H. H. Holmes was often involved in insurance scams and confidence tricks. Harold Shipman had a previous conviction for prescription fraud and forgery, for which he was fined £600.

More known "Angels of Death" include:

 Beverley Allitt, English nurse who murdered four child patients
 Kristen Gilbert, American nurse and convicted serial killer
 Donald Harvey, American orderly and convicted serial killer
 Aino Nykopp-Koski, Finnish nurse convicted of five murders and five attempts of murder.
 Michael Swango, American physician who poisoned over 30 patients and coworkers
 Niels Högel, German nurse and convicted serial killer
 Efren Saldivar, American respiratory therapist at Adventist Health Glendale in Glendale, California and convicted serial killer

In popular culture 
The two spinster aunts in Joseph Kesselring's play Arsenic and Old Lace act as angels of mercy for lonely old men, poisoning them with elderberry wine laced with arsenic, strychnine and cyanide.

The character Annie Wilkes in the Stephen King novel Misery seems to be a serial killer of this type. Additionally, "angel of mercy" is mentioned in Agatha Christie's novel By the Pricking of My Thumbs. The novel The 5th Horseman in James Patterson's Women's Murder Club series features an "Angel of Mercy" serial killer. The term is also mentioned in a Fear Factory song "Demanufacture".

In the television series Dexter, Dexter Morgan's first kill is his father's nurse, an angel of mercy, who worked in the fictional Angel of Mercy Hospital.

In season 1, episode 5 of the television series Elementary, "Lesser Evils", Sherlock Holmes solves a series of angel of death murders at a hospital, revealed to be the work of the janitor, himself an ex-doctor.

In season 3, episode 7 of the television series Lie to Me, " Veronica", Dr. Lightman helps a woman with early-onset Alzheimer's disease uncover a traumatic memory from her past, and in the process discovers that there may be an "angel of death" working in her health care facility.

British soap opera Hollyoaks featured a storyline of the "gloved hand killer" featuring Lindsey Butterfield a seemingly hardworking and kind doctor who crumbled under the pressure to be in control. She administered potassium chloride injections to patients to render heart attacks and cover her tracks. She killed seven people and attempted to kill three more, and attempted to kill her younger sister as a young girl.

American TV series, "Fargo (TV series)" featured a fledgling Angel Mercy in Season 4, episode 1 - 2. The character “Nurse Oraetta Mayflower”, played by Jessie Buckley, attempts to shoot a fatal dose of morphine into Italian-American crime boss Donatello Fadda, referring to herself as an Angel of Mercy. From here, she begins to expand her purview.

The character Mildred Ratched in Netflix’ series Ratched is also described as an angel of mercy.

Karl Kopfrkingl in the Czech new wave classic The Cremator is a rare non-medical example of this criminal pathology. He murders his Jewish family under the belief he is freeing them from suffering and sending them on to better lives.

The character Bertram Filcott in the second season of the show Why Women Kill has the behavior of an angel of mercy.

The protagonist in the Kill Chain Series by William Hertling goes by the handle "AngelOfMercy" online.

See also 
 List of serial killers with health related professions
 Abuse during childbirth (including abuse by medical professionals)

References 

Serial killers